René Martín Lima (born 3 January 1985 in Vicente López, Buenos Aires) is an Argentine footballer, who plays as a midfielder for Comunicaciones.

Career
Lima made his debut for River Plate on 23 November 2003, in a 1–0 defeat by Chacarita Juniors. He has also played for Maccabi Haifa of Israel, Gimnasia de La Plata and Gimnasia de Jujuy.

In 2009, he was signed by Argentinos Juniors.

Honours

External links
  
 
 

1985 births
Living people
Argentine footballers
Argentine expatriate footballers
Association football midfielders
People from Vicente López Partido
Sportspeople from Buenos Aires Province
Club de Gimnasia y Esgrima La Plata footballers
Gimnasia y Esgrima de Jujuy footballers
Argentinos Juniors footballers
Maccabi Haifa F.C. players
Instituto footballers
Cobreloa footballers
Unión Española footballers
Club Atlético River Plate footballers
Centro Atlético Fénix players
Independiente Rivadavia footballers
Murciélagos FC footballers
Sportivo Italiano footballers
Club Atlético Douglas Haig players
Comisión de Actividades Infantiles footballers
San Telmo footballers
Club Comunicaciones footballers
Chilean Primera División players
Argentine Primera División players
Argentine expatriate sportspeople in Chile
Argentine expatriate sportspeople in Israel
Argentine expatriate sportspeople in Mexico
Argentine expatriate sportspeople in Uruguay
Expatriate footballers in Israel
Expatriate footballers in Chile
Expatriate footballers in Mexico
Expatriate footballers in Uruguay